Earl Genard Calloway (born September 30, 1983) is an American-born naturalized Bulgarian professional basketball player for the Ottawa Blackjacks of the Canadian Elite Basketball League (CEBL).

High school career
Calloway played high school basketball at Westlake High School, in Atlanta, Georgia. He was a member of the 1999 GHSA State Championship team at Westlake with former NFL players Adam "Pac-Man" Jones, Keyaron Fox as well as a member of the 2002 State Championship Team.

College career
Calloway played college basketball at  New Mexico State from 2002 to 2003, at Georgia Perimeter College from 2004 to 2005 and at Indiana University with Indiana Hoosiers from 2005 to 2007.

Career overview
After going undrafted in the 2007 NBA draft, Calloway joined Fort Wayne Mad Ants of the NBA Development League. He led his team in scoring with 19 points per game and was sixth in the league with 5.8 assists and fourth with 2.1 steals per game. He also contributed 5.1 rebounds per game and was named team MVP at the end of the season.

The next season, he signed with Cibona Zagreb. With Cibona, he won the Croatian League and the Croatian Cup.

On August 3, 2009, Calloway joined Cajasol on a one-year deal. In his first season with Cajasol, he averaged 9.4 points and 4.2 assists in 36 Spanish League games. On July 23, 2010, he extended his contract until the end of the 2011–12 season.

From 2012 to 2014 he played with Unicaja.

In July 2014, he signed a two-year deal with the Turkish team Royal Halı Gaziantep.

On August 24, 2016, Calloway signed with İstanbul BB for the 2016–17 season.

On October 25, 2017, Calloway signed with Uşak Sportif.

On July 8, 2019, Calloway signed with the Spanish club Monbus Obradoiro.

On June 24, 2020, he has signed with Rouen Métropole Basket of the French Pro B. However, on August 16 it was announced that he was suffering from a knee problem and would not join the team.

On May 19, 2021, Calloway signed with the Ottawa Blackjacks of the Canadian Elite Basketball League.

The Basketball Tournament (TBT) (2016–present) 
In the summers of 2016 and 2017, Calloway played in The Basketball Tournament on ESPN for team Trained To Go.  He competed for the $2 million prize, and in 2016, averaged 5.3 points per game.  In 2017, Calloway and team Trained To Go lost in the first round of the tournament to the Broad Street Brawlers 108–95.

Bulgaria national team
Calloway has citizenship with Bulgaria, and he played with the senior men's Bulgaria national basketball team at the qualification tournament for EuroBasket 2011

Euroleague career statistics

|-
| style="text-align:left;"| 2008–09
| style="text-align:left;"| Cibona
| 16 || 16 || 29.6 || .507 || .333 || .842 || 3.4 || 2.8 || 1.6 || .0 || 12.6 || 13.8
|-
| style="text-align:left;"| 2012–13
| style="text-align:left;"| Unicaja
| 23 || 19 || 25.0 || .497 || .443 || .733 || 3.1 || 2.3 || 1.2 || .2 || 9.3 || 11.3
|-
| style="text-align:left;"| 2013–14
| style="text-align:left;"| Unicaja
| 22 || 17 || 19.5 || .422 || .362 || .933 || 2.1 || 2.9 || .8 || .1 || 6.7 || 7.1
|- class="sortbottom"
| style="text-align:left;"| Career
| style="text-align:left;"|
| 61 || 52 || 24.2 || .477 || .391 || .824 || 2.8 || 2.6 || 1.2 || .1 || 9.2 || 10.5

References

External links
 Euroleague.net Profile
 Indiana University profile

1983 births
Living people
ABA League players
Afyonkarahisar Belediyespor players
American emigrants to Bulgaria
American expatriate basketball people in Croatia
American expatriate basketball people in Spain
American expatriate basketball people in Turkey
American men's basketball players
Basketball players from Atlanta
Bulgarian men's basketball players
Bulgarian expatriate basketball people in Spain
Bulgarian expatriate basketball people in Turkey
Bulgarian people of American descent
Baloncesto Málaga players
Real Betis Baloncesto players
Fort Wayne Mad Ants players
Gaziantep Basketbol players
Perimeter College at Georgia State University alumni
Indiana Hoosiers men's basketball players
İstanbul Büyükşehir Belediyespor basketball players
Junior college men's basketball players in the United States
KK Cibona players
Liga ACB players
Mersin Büyükşehir Belediyesi S.K. players
Naturalised citizens of Bulgaria
New Mexico State Aggies men's basketball players
Obradoiro CAB players
Point guards
Uşak Sportif players
Ottawa Blackjacks players